Against Happiness: In Praise of Melancholy is a nonfiction book by Eric G. Wilson that examines the benefits of being sad. The author denotes in the book that diagnosable conditions should be treated accordingly, and is in no way saying it is "normal" or "good" to be depressed. Rather, he seeks to point out that melancholy, or as he dubs it "generative melancholy" can be a powerfully creative force that has motivated the likes of Virginia Woolf, John Keats, Vincent van Gogh, and Ludwig van Beethoven to produce some of the greatest artistic masterpieces of their respective genres. Further, he expresses concern that America's aggressive diagnosis of any negative mood, however slight, as bad, abnormal, or dangerous will lead to an eradication of one of the most powerfully inspirational and motivational forces and its potential products.

External links
NPR story on the book

2008 non-fiction books
American non-fiction books
Farrar, Straus and Giroux books
Depression (mood)